Muramasa Sengo was a famous Japanese swordsmith who founded the Muramasa school of sword-making in the early 16th century CE.

Muramasa may also refer to:
Muramasa: The Demon Blade, a 2009 video game for the Wii, later released as Muramasa Rebirth on PS Vita
Mura Masa, a UK electronic music artist
Muramasa Blade, a fictional sword in Marvel Comics used by Wolverine
Muramasa, one of the primary antagonists of the anime series Bleach
Full Metal Daemon: Muramasa, a 2009 visual novel by Nitroplus